Starourtayevo (İśke Urtay) is a rural locality (a selo) in Starobaishevsky Selsoviet, Dyurtyulinsky District, Bashkortostan, Russia. The population was 396 as of 2010. There are 7 streets.

Geography 
Starourtayevo is located 26 km southeast of Dyurtyuli (the district's administrative centre) by road. Starobaishevo is the nearest rural locality.

References 

Rural localities in Dyurtyulinsky District